Arthur Hill may refer to:

Actors and craftsmen
 Arthur Hill (English actor) (1875–1932), English theatre and film actor who wore animal costumes
 Arthur Hill Gilbert (1894–1970), American Impressionist painter
 Arthur Hill (Canadian actor) (1922–2006), American-based Canadian actor

Peers and politicians
 Arthur Hill (before 1610—1663), Anglo-Irish soldier, Marquess of Downshire ancestor
 Arthur Hill, 2nd Marquess of Downshire (1753–1801), British peer and Member of Parliament
 Arthur Hill, 3rd Marquess of Downshire (1788–1845), Irish peer
 Arthur Hill, 2nd Baron Sandys (1793–1860), Anglo-Irish soldier and politician
 Lord Arthur Augustus Edwin Hill (1800–1831), son of Arthur Hill, 2nd Marquess of Downshire
 Arthur Hill, 4th Marquess of Downshire (1812–1868), Irish peer
 Arthur Hill Gillmor (1824–1903), Canadian farmer, lumberman and Liberal politician
 Arthur Hill, 5th Marquess of Downshire (1844–1874), Irish peer
 Lord Arthur Hill (1846–1931), Anglo-Irish soldier and politician
 Arthur Hill, 6th Marquess of Downshire (1871–1918), Irish peer
 Arthur Hill (politician) (1873–1913), British Unionist politician
 Arthur Hill, 7th Marquess of Downshire (1894–1989), Irish peer
 Lord Arthur Francis Hill (1895–1953), father of Arthur Robin Ian Hill, 8th Marquess of Downshire
 Arthur Robin Ian Hill, 8th Marquess of Downshire (1929–2003), Irish peer

Scholars
 Arthur George Hill (1857–1923), English organ builder and man of letters
 Arthur D. Hill (1869–1947), American legal expert
 J. Arthur Hill (1872–1951), English psychical researcher and writer
 Sir Arthur William Hill (1875–1941), English botanist and taxonomist
 Arthur VanCleve Hill (born 1950), American professor of operations management

Sportsmen
 Arthur Hill (Australian cricketer) (1871–1936), right-hand batsman
 Arthur James Ledger Hill, 1871–1950), English cricketer
 Arthur Bertram St Hill (1872–1911), Barbadian cricketer
 Arthur Edwin Hill (1888–1966), British water polo Olympian
 Artur Hill or Artur Khil (born 1993), names used by Russian figure skater Artur Gachinski

See also
 Arthur Hill-Trevor (disambiguation)
 Arthur Hill High School, Saginaw, Michigan
 Arthur's Hill, area of Newcastle upon Tyne, England
 Arthur Hill Hassall (1817–1894), English physician, chemist and microscopist
 Arthur Hills (1930–2021), American golf course designer
 Hill (surname)